Erland Franz Herkenrath (September 24, 1912 – July 17, 2003) was a Swiss field handball player who competed in the 1936 Summer Olympics.

He was born in Zürich and died in Weggis.

In 1936 he was part of the Swiss field handball team, which won the bronze medal. He played all five matches.

References

1912 births
2003 deaths
Swiss male handball players
Olympic handball players of Switzerland
Field handball players at the 1936 Summer Olympics
Olympic bronze medalists for Switzerland
Olympic medalists in handball
Medalists at the 1936 Summer Olympics
Sportspeople from Zürich